The Pennzoil 150 is a NASCAR Xfinity Series auto race held at the Indianapolis Motor Speedway since 2012. It takes place the Saturday of Kroger Super Weekend.  This race replaced the Kroger 200, which had been held at the nearby Lucas Oil Raceway at Indianapolis, formerly known as Indianapolis Raceway Park, for the previous 30 years. Brad Keselowski won the inaugural event.

For 2016, as part of the Xfinity "Dash for Cash" format, the race was 250 miles in total, but two 20-lap heat races, similar to the Can-Am Duel, was to be added to be run prior to the 60-lap main event. In 2017, the race would not continue the heat races and instead use the new stage format with stages 1 and 2 being 25 laps each, and stage 3 being 50 laps. In addition, the event would not be a Dash for Cash event and that has been moved to Phoenix's Spring event. In late-June 2017, due to drivers saying that they could go easily 25 laps on tires and fuel, NASCAR increased the length of stages 1 and 2 from 25 laps to 30 laps each, with the final 40 laps making up Stage 3.

On January 15, 2020, new track owner Roger Penske announced that the race will move from the oval to the track's infield road course; Penske had purchased the track in late-2019. Despite the switch, the NASCAR Cup Series' Brickyard 400 continues to race on the oval, although the Cup race did move to the road course the next season. Royal Dutch Shell took over as title sponsor of the race, renaming it the Pennzoil 150 after their Pennzoil brand.  

On March 26, 2020, as part of changes to the 2020 IndyCar Series schedule to account for the COVID-19 pandemic, it was announced that the series' GMR Grand Prix—an IMS road course race typically held as a prelude to the Indianapolis 500—would be postponed to July 4, 2020, and form an IndyCar/NASCAR double-header with the Pennzoil 150.

Past winners

2016: Race split into a 60-lap feature, preceded by 2x20-lap heat races for the Xfinity Dash 4 Cash program; feature extended due to NASCAR overtime.
2018: Race postponed from Saturday to Monday due to rain.

Multiple winners (drivers)

Multiple winners (teams)

Manufacturer wins

Race recaps
2012 – Brad Keselowski won the inaugural event and marked the last NASCAR Nationwide Series win for manufacturer Dodge after announcing they would not return to the top 3 divisions in 2013.
2013 – Brian Scott looked like he could win his first NNS race until Kyle Busch passed him in the final laps en route to victory.
2014 – Kyle Busch seemed like he had the race won but Ty Dillon made a move that won him the race.  Dillon thus became the first Nationwide regular to win the event.
2015 – Ryan Blaney led at the white flag, but Kyle Busch passed him down the backstretch to win his second career Xfinity Series race at the Brickyard.

Qualifying race winners

References

External links
 
 

2012 establishments in Indiana
NASCAR Xfinity Series races
 
Recurring sporting events established in 2012
Annual sporting events in the United States